Mont-ral is a municipality in the comarca of Alt Camp, Tarragona, Catalonia, Spain.

The Prades Mountains are located within the municipal boundaries.

History
Mont-ral was part of the Montblanc Vegueria until 1716. Later it became part of the Tarragona Corregiment administrative division.

This municipality had over 1,000 inhabitants during the second half of the 19th century, but has lost almost 80% of its population since then.

Villages
L'Aixàviga, 14 
El Bosquet, 24 
La Cabrera, 3 
La Cadeneta, 12 
Farena 46 
Mont-ral 81

References

External links 
 Farena – the fairy tale village of the Prades Mountains, in Catalonia, Spain (in English)

Official website
Tourist information
 Government data pages 

Municipalities in Alt Camp
Populated places in Alt Camp